The Wenchang Space Launch Site, located in Wenchang, Hainan, China, is a rocket launch site—one of the two spacecraft launch sites of Xichang Satellite Launch Center (the other site is in Xichang, Sichuan).

A former suborbital test center, it is China's fourth and southernmost space vehicle launch facility (spaceport). It was selected for its low latitude, which is only 19° north of the equator, allowing for the increase in payload necessary for launching China's future space station. It is capable of launching the Long March 5, the most powerful Chinese rocket.

Unlike the space centers on the mainland, whose rail tracks are too narrow to transport the new five meter core boosters, Wenchang uses its sea port for deliveries. Initial launches of the CZ-5 booster from Wenchang were expected to start in 2014, one year after the intended commissioning of the Wenchang Launch Site. However, the first launch of CZ-5 was later shifted to 2016 and took place on 3 November 2016. The CZ-5B (maximum payload to LEO) variant was expected to be completed circa 2018 but the maiden flight took place on 5 May 2020. A CZ-5 carrier rocket was already shipped from North China's Tianjin port on 20 September 2015 for a rehearsal (Drills carried out on the launch pad, involving both the carrier rocket and a probe) of a scheduled Chang'e-5 lunar mission, which was planned for around 2019 and was successfully launched on 23 November 2020.

The construction of the site was completed by October 2014. The first launch took place successfully on 25 June 2016.

Reasons for selection
At 19 degrees north latitude, the Wenchang Space Launch Site is located on the Chinese island of Hainan, which has the lowest land latitude in China and is the nearest to the equator. Low-latitude locations are desirable for space launch sites due to the higher speed of rotation closer to the equator, as well as needing a smaller inclination change maneuver to reach geosynchronous orbit. Hainan also has a large range of allowable launch azimuths, satisfying the requirement of launching payloads to orbital inclinations between 90 and 175 degrees. Because rockets launched from Hainan Island are within 10 kilometers of the ocean in the direction of launch, falling rocket debris is less likely to cause accidents, reducing the risk of accidents in the rocket flight and debris landing areas. Furthermore, the launch site offers room for potential for expansion, minimal operational expenses, and few restrictions, making it ideal for long-term development and international collaboration.

Economic potential 
Wenchang Space City is in the northeast coastal section of Dongjiao Town, Wenchang City, with a coastline of roughly 4,100 meters and an area of 7,336 acres, starting from the control area of the space launch site in the north. The project is designed to include a theme park area, a central lake area (commercial and leisure function), and an ecological coconut forest region (holiday and residential function), with a total construction land area of 6,046 acres. Hainan, as a tourist destination in China with many tourism resources is predicted to grow. This space launch site was included in Hainan Province's 11th Five-Year Plan in 2010.

Planning and construction
Political considerations had postponed the construction of a large space center in Hainan many times due to it being considered too vulnerable to foreign attacks. Following the end of the Cold War and the easing of global tensions, new projects for its development were submitted.

According to a report by China Central Television (CCTV), the construction of the new Wenchang Satellite Launch Center was officially approved by the State Council and the Central Military Commission of the People's Republic of China on 22 September 2007.

In late October 2007, the Mayor of Wenchang announced that  of land would be obtained for the center and more than 6,000 people, mostly from the villages of Longlou (龙楼) and Dongjiao (东郊) would be relocated as a consequence.

A subsequent article in November 2007 indicated that the actual launch site would be near Longlou, while a space-science theme park would be built near Dongjiao. Satellite photography of April 2011 shows a new clearing  near the beach that is consistent with artist's concept pictures of the CZ-5 launch pad that have been displayed in China.

Launch pads
A total of three launch pads are planned.

One of the launch pads is designed for a CZ-5 service structure and launch gantry.

Another launch pad was made for the CZ-7 service structure and launch gantry.

Launch history

The first launch was a Long March 7 which took place successfully 25 June 2016.

On 3 November 2016, the Long March 5 rocket made its maiden flight from the launch site.

On 2 July 2017, a Long March 5 launch failed to complete its mission to put a seven ton Shijian-18 communications satellite into orbit.

The third flight of Long March 5 occurred on 27 December 2019 from Wenchang LC-1.

The maiden flight of the Long March 5B variant took place on 5 May 2020 from Wenchang LC-1.

On 23 July 2020, the fourth flight of Long March 5 put China's first indigenous Mars orbiter/rover Tianwen-1 directly into TMI from Wenchang.

The maiden flight of Long March 8 occurred on 22 December 2020 from Wenchang LC-2.

On 29 April 2021, the core module Tianhe of the China Space Station was successfully launched aboard a Long March 5B rocket from Wenchang LC-1.

On 29 May 2021, a cargo resupply ship named Tianzhou-2 launched on a Long March 7 (Y3) rocket from LC-2 to rendezvous with the China Space Station as preparation for the upcoming Shenzhou-12 crewed mission.

See also
 Chinese space program
 Jiuquan Satellite Launch Center 
 Taiyuan Satellite Launch Center 
 Xichang Satellite Launch Center
 Wenchang Commercial Space Launch Site

References

External links

 
 
 Hainan Space Center
 

Buildings and structures in Hainan
Chinese space program facilities
Spaceports in China
2014 establishments in China